Harry Whitney was an American sportsman.

Harry Whitney may also refer to:

Harry Payne Whitney (1872–1930), American businessman and thoroughbred horse breeder
Harry Whitney, a character in the film Andre

See also
Henry Whitney (disambiguation)